Blossomy is the eleventh studio album (the 13th album overall) by the Taiwanese Mandopop girl group S.H.E. It was released on November 16, 2012 by HIM International Music, two years and eight months after their last album, SHERO. It was their first album since member Selina Ren sustained serious burn injuries in an accident while shooting a drama.

The title track, "花又開好了" (Blossomy), was first broadcast on Hit FM on October 22, 2012. The full version was released on October 24, 2012. Its accompanying music video was broadcast on seven Taiwanese news channels.

The album is the sixth best-selling album in Taiwan in 2012. The tracks "花又開好了" (Blossomy), "心還是熱的" (Warm Heart) and "像女孩的女人" (The Innocent Women) are listed at number 5, 38 and 57 respectively on Hit FM's Annual Top 100 Singles Chart for 2012.

Track listing

Bonus DVD

References

2012 albums
S.H.E albums
HIM International Music albums